The discography for American musician B. J. Thomas includes releases from five decades, between the 1960s and the 2010s. Thomas is best remembered for his hit songs during the 1960s and 1970s, which appeared on the pop, country and Christian music charts. His popular recordings include the Burt Bacharach and Hal David song "Raindrops Keep Fallin' on My Head", the Larry Butler and Chips Moman song "(Hey Won't You Play) Another Somebody Done Somebody Wrong Song", and the original version of the Mark James song "Hooked on a Feeling".

Albums 

AShining also peaked at No. 17 on the RPM Country Albums chart in Canada.

Singles 
Note: Singles without indicated B-sides may have been only released as promotional copies with stereo and mono versions of the same song.

Guest singles

Music videos

Other album appearances 
 "Hallowed Be Thy Name" from The Lord's Prayer (1980)
 "Suspicious Minds" from Remembering Elvis: Louisiana Hayrides & Tribute (1999)
 "Let There Be Peace on Earth" from Inspirations – George Foreman (2003)
 "Tomorrow Never Comes" from Ernest Tubb's Special Guests (2004)
 "Raindrops Keep Falling on My Head" from Good Times Again – Glen Campbell (2007)
 "Raindrops Keep Falling on My Head" from Even More One Hit Wonders – Lynn Anderson (2008)
 "100% Chance of Pain" from Partners, Vol. 2 – T.G. Sheppard (2012)
 "Sunny" from Duets with My American Idols – Oleg Frish (2014)

References

External links 
 

Discographies of American artists
Christian music discographies
Country music discographies
Pop music discographies
Rock music discographies